Manqutay (also Romanized as Manqūţāy and Manqūtāy) is a village in Sain Rural District, in the Central District of Sarab County, East Azerbaijan Province, Iran. At the 2006 census, its population was 171, in 37 families.

Name 
According to Vladimir Minorsky, the name "Manqutay" is derived from a Mongolian personal name, Manqutay, with one example being the father of the Ilkhanid general Qutlugh-Shah.

References 

Populated places in Sarab County